The geographical centre of Switzerland has the coordinates  (Swiss Grid: 660158/183641). It is located at Älggi-Alp in the municipality of Sachseln, Obwalden. The point is the centre of mass determined in 1988 by Swisstopo.

As the point is difficult to access, a stone was set 500 m further south-east on Älggi Alp (1645 m). A plaque on the stone commemorates the winner of the "Swiss of the Year" award.

External links 
 https://web.archive.org/web/20120607113752/http://www.swisstopo.admin.ch/internet/swisstopo/en/home/topics/knowledge/center_ch.html
 https://web.archive.org/web/20111113181702/http://www.ch.ch/schweiz/01865/01885/01904/02135/index.html?lang=en
 https://web.archive.org/web/20160303224820/http://skatingland.myswitzerland.com/en/sightseeing_detail.cfm?id=340745
 https://web.archive.org/web/20120308105359/http://www.wanderland.ch/en/orte_detail.cfm?id=315425

Switzerland
Geography of Obwalden
Centre
Tourist attractions in Obwalden